The Clayton State Lakers are the athletic teams that represent Clayton State University, located in Morrow, Georgia, in intercollegiate sports at the Division II level of the National Collegiate Athletic Association (NCAA), primarily competing in the Peach Belt Conference since the 1995–96 academic year.

Clayton State competes in eleven intercollegiate varsity sports. Men's sports include basketball, cross country, golf, soccer, and track and field (both indoor and outdoor); while women's sports include basketball, cross country, soccer, and track and field (both indoor and outdoor). Women's tennis was discontinued at the end of the 2016–17 academic year.

Conference affiliations 
NCAA
 Peach Belt Conference (1995–present)

Varsity teams

National championships

Team
Clayton State University won its first national championship in school history when the Lakers won the NCAA Division II women's basketball national title in 2011. It is still the only women's basketball championship won by a team from the Southeast Region.

Notable alumni

Men's basketball 
 Kevin Young

Men's soccer 
 Chris Klute
 Janiel Simon

Women's soccer 
 Manoly Baquerizo
 Jency Ramírez
 Pearl Slattery

References

External links